Sturmanite is a rare sulfate mineral with the chemical formula Ca6Fe3+2(SO4)2.5(B(OH)4)(OH)12 · 25 H2O. It crystallises in the tetragonal system and it has a Moh's hardness of 2.5. Sturmanite has a bright yellow to amber colour and falls in the ettringite group. It was named after Bozidar Darko Sturman (born 1937), Croatian-Canadian mineralogist and Curator Emeritus of Mineralogy, Royal Ontario Museum.

Occurrence 
Sturmanite was first identified in 1983 and approved by the IMA in the same year. It was first found in the Black Rock Mine, Black Rock, Kalahari manganese field, Northern Cape Province, South Africa. It is found as flattened dipyramidal crystals on hematite and baryte. Sturmanite has also been identified in mines near the Black Rock Mine, such as the Wessel's and Perth mines, in the N'Chwaning mines, and near Lakargi Mountain in Russia. It is found as a rare secondary mineral embedded in manganese deposits and is associated with baryte, manganite, hausmannite, and hematite.

Crystal structure 
The crystal structure of sturmanite shows two distinct features: one being columns of iron-octahedra and calcium polyhedra, the other being the SO4− and B(OH)4− tetrahedra surrounding these columns. These two structures are linked together through a dense and complex network of hydrogen bonds.

References 

Iron(III) minerals
Calcium minerals
Sulfate minerals
Hydroxide minerals
Borate minerals
Trigonal minerals
Minerals in space group 159
Borate sulfates